Kiella is a town in the Kongoussi Department of Bam Province in northern Burkina Faso. It has a population of 1,826.

References

Populated places in the Centre-Nord Region
Bam Province